Second Russian Avant-Garde was a movement in Russian art, primarily in fine arts and poetry, which began in the mid-1950s and ended in the late 1980s. The movement's birth is associated with the Khrushchev Thaw and with the 6th World Festival of Youth and Students in 1957 in Moscow. The concept was introduced into cultural circulation by Mikhail Grobman during his visit to the Tel Aviv Art Museum in the late 1950s, and by the late 1980s the term had become a solidified historical movement.

History 

As part of the 6th International Festival of Youth and Students held in 1957, an art exhibition was held, at which visitors were invited to get acquainted with the works of contemporary artists from 52 countries around the world. Thus, for Russian artists, it was a chance to open the Iron Curtain and look at what is being said in the world of culture and art abroad. This exhibition made a deep impression on many, giving impetus to the development of  new styles of art in the Soviet Union. This new, often unofficial art due to the artist's chosen style and ideological position, according to the account of Mikhail Grobman, was the beginning of "the second Russian avant-garde" or "the second wave of Russian avant-garde" following the first "wave" during the late 1890s to the 1930s.

According to the art critic Lelya Kantor-Kazovskaya, in the late 1950s the Museum of Modern Art in New York began to expand alongside the creation of the Congress for Cultural Freedom, sponsored by the US Government and the CIA, to combat the Cold War from a cultural angle and the spread of communist ideology. In 1959, the American National Exhibition was held in Moscow.  

The period from the late 50s to the early 60s in the Soviet Union was marked by an expansion of innovation and creation in all spheres of Russian cultural life. Thanks to the Khrushchev Thaw, previously censored creative ideas and movements were allowed to finally openly express themselves. In 1954, the artist Ely Belyutin created the "New Reality" art studio. Belyutin developed a special methodology based on different teaching systems, including the method created by Russian painter Pavel Petrovich Chistyakov which focused on analyzing and taking into account the fine details of one's subject as well as the Russian avant-garde artists of the 1920s and their movements of Constructivism and Suprematism.

However, the period of the "Thaw" did not last forever, nor did the freedoms it allowed. In 1962, at the art exhibition "30 Years of the Moscow Artists' Union" held in Manezh Khrushchev, after having observed the works of Belyutin's New Reality studio, declared that in matters of art he remained a Stalinist in his ideology and philosophical point of view. He saw Belyutin's works as polluting the ideals of Socialist Realism with highly sexual and provocative imagery. The event is historically called the Manege Affair, and marked a return in state control over the development of Soviet cultural production. The consequences of this affair by Khrushchev had widespread ramifications within \the Union, and the previous condemnation of the movements of Formalism and Abstractionism were intensified. However, during the period of the 1970s to 1990s, the notion of "unofficial art" and the "unofficial artist" didn't have one exact conception. Yet, ten years prior during the 1950s and 60s it was slightly more clear as the Khrushchev That had opened up the ability to publically question the Socialist ideology, although within tightly codified boundaries.

Artists 
Despite the lack of state support, and sometimes persecution from the authorities, artists continued to develop their craft. Grobman's list of "Second Avant-Garde" artists include 35 artists. Among them:

20th Century 

 Ely Belyutin
 Eric Bulatov
 Lucian Gribkov
 Boris Zhutovsky

21st Century 

 Yuri Zlotnikov
 Vladislav Zubarev
 Ilya Kabakov
 Vladimir Nemukhin
 Dmitry Plavinsky
 Anatoly Safokhin
 Tamara Ter-Ghevondyan
 Boris Turetsky

Exhibitions 

 1962 - Exhibition of the 30th anniversary of the Moscow Union of Artists in the Manege (Moscow)
 1960-1992 - exhibitions of "New Reality"  (Abramtsevo)
 1969 - joint exhibition with L. Gribkov. Vspolny (Moscow)
 1989 - the first exhibition of the studio "Temporal Reality". Central House of Artists (Moscow)
 1990 – exhibition “From the Manege to the Manege. New Reality”, together with the artists of the New Reality. Central Exhibition Hall Manege (Moscow)

See also 
 Second Russian Avant-Garde (Russian)

References 

Soviet Nonconformist Art
Avant-garde art
Art history
Russian art